Sara Orlesky (born July 30, 1980) is a Canadian sports reporter, currently a senior host and producer for the Winnipeg Jets. She was formerly the Winnipeg Bureau Reporter for TSN's SportsCentre. In 2008, The Globe and Mail described her as "among the top young female sports broadcasters in Canada."

Biography 
Sara Orlesky was born in Winnipeg, Manitoba, July 31, 1980. She graduated from Shaftesbury High School in Winnipeg.

Hired in November 2007, Orlesky joined TSN in January 2008 as a reporter for the Toronto bureau, reporting on major sports stories in the Greater Toronto Area.

Before working at TSN, Orlesky lived in Vancouver, British Columbia where she reported for The Score. Orlesky worked for Citytv Vancouver as a weekend sports producer while studying communications at Simon Fraser University. She was promoted to weekend sports anchor and left there in 2004. Orlesky reported on figure skating at the 2010 Winter Olympics.

When TSN opened its Winnipeg bureau, Orlesky became the lead reporter. She was regularly seen on SportsCentre, with a special focus on the Jets and Blue Bombers. She also joined the CFL on TSN broadcast team as a sideline reporter in the 2008 season where she has since covered regular season and playoff games, including the Grey Cup.

She joined the Winnipeg Jets in summer 2022 in a partnership with TSN. With that, she continues to make appearances on Jets on TSN broadcasts.

References

External links
TSN profile
 

1980 births
Living people
Olympic Games broadcasters
Canadian television producers
Canadian women television producers
Canadian television reporters and correspondents
Simon Fraser University alumni
Canadian women television journalists
Winnipeg Jets announcers
National Hockey League broadcasters
Canadian Football League announcers
Journalists from Manitoba
People from Winnipeg
American women television journalists
21st-century American women
Canadian people of Ukrainian descent